The 2007–08 Druga HNL season was the 17th since its establishment. The first placed team were Croatia sesvete and the last four clubs were relegated to Treća HNL.

Changes from last season
The following clubs have been promoted or relegated at the end of the 2006–07 season:

From 2. HNL
Promoted to 1. HNL
 Inter Zaprešić (winners of 2006–07 Druga HNL)
 Zadar (2nd place)1

Relegated to 3. HNL
 Naftaš HAŠK (10th place)2
 Koprivnica (14th place)
 Bjelovar (15th place)
 Čakovec (16th place)

To 2. HNL
Relegated from 1. HNL
 Pula (11th place)
 Kamen Ingrad (12th place)

Promoted from 3. HNL
 Slavonac CO (3. HNL East winners) 
 Trogir (3. HNL South winners)
 Vinogradar (3. HNL West winners)
 Segesta (3. HNL West runners-up)3

Notes
1 In a two-legged promotion/relegation playoff between Zadar (as 2. HNL runners-up) and Pula (as 11th placed 1. HNL team), the former earned promotion to Prva HNL by beating Pula with 5–2 on aggregate.
2 Naftaš HAŠK didn't obtain a licence for competing in Druga HNL, and because of that 13th placed Moslavina were allowed to stay in the 2. HNL.
3 Segesta, as the 3. HNL West runners-up, qualified for the two-legged promotion playoff, which takes place between second-placed teams of 3. HNL East and West Division. In the playoff, they defeated 3. HNL East runners-up Suhopolje with an aggregate score 6–2.

Clubs

League table

See also
2007–08 Prva HNL
2007–08 Croatian Cup

References

External links
League's official website 

First Football League (Croatia) seasons
Drug
Cro